Casuarina Square, the largest shopping centre in the Northern Territory, is located in Casuarina in Darwin's northern suburbs. The shopping centre is built to the building code for Tropical Cyclones, due to cyclones that sweep through the area such as Cyclone Tracy in 1974.

Casuarina Square was built in 1973, the shopping centre contains over 180 businesses including two supermarkets (Coles and Woolworths), and two discount department stores (Big W and Kmart), and a 7-screen BCC Cinemas.

The GPT group owns and manages the shopping centre and since building the centre before a change of ownership to Sentinel Property Group in April 2022, it has undergone four major redevelopments. The most recent was a three-stage redevelopment that was completed in December 1998 adding 63 specialty stores and the 7-screen BCC Cinemas. Since then the average number of visits per week is greater than twice the population of Darwin.

On 1st of April 2022, Casuarina Square was bought by Sentinel Property Group for $400 million.

Transport
Casuarina Square is accessible from Trower Road and by the bus routes of 1, 2, 3, 4, 5, 9, 10, 11, 12 and 21.
The shopping centre is located 14 km north of Darwin city centre.

The shopping centre has over 2,400 parking spaces including undercover parking. Access to the car parks is from Trower Road, Dripstone Road and Bradshaw Terrace.

See also
List of shopping centres in Australia
 Public transport in Darwin

References

External links
 
 Casuarina Square homepage

Shopping centres in Darwin, Northern Territory
Shopping malls established in 1974
Tourist attractions in Darwin, Northern Territory